The 2018 Oracle Challenger Series – Indian Wells is a professional tennis tournament played on outdoor hard courts. This tournament is part of the 2018 ATP Challenger Tour and the 2018 WTA 125K series. The first edition took place on February 26 through March 4, 2018 in Indian Wells, United States.

Men's singles main-draw entrants

Seeds

 1 Rankings are as of 19 February 2018.

Other entrants
The following players received wildcards into the singles main draw:
  Evan King
  Sebastian Korda
  Reilly Opelka
  Noah Rubin

The following player received entry into the singles main draw as a special exempt:
  Dennis Novikov

The following player received entry into the singles main draw as an alternate:
  Ricardo Ojeda Lara

The following players received entry from the qualifying draw:
  Marcos Giron
  Christian Harrison
  Mitchell Krueger
  Alexander Sarkissian

The following player received entry as a lucky loser:
  Nicolaas Scholtz

Women's singles main-draw entrants

Seeds

 1 Rankings are as of 19 February 2018.

Other entrants
The following players received wildcards into the singles main draw:
  Danielle Collins
  Caroline Dolehide
  Ashley Kratzer
  Vera Zvonareva

The following players received entry from the qualifying draw:
  Amanda Anisimova
  Naomi Broady
  Misaki Doi
  Victoria Duval
  Sara Errani
  Wang Yafan

Withdrawals
Before the tournament
  Ekaterina Alexandrova → replaced by  Kristie Ahn
  Monica Niculescu → replaced by  Evgeniya Rodina
  Naomi Osaka → replaced by  Richèl Hogenkamp

WTA doubles main-draw entrants

Seeds

 1 Rankings as of 19 February 2018.

Other entrants
The following team received wildcard into the doubles main draw:
  Julia Elbaba /  Ingrid Neel

Champions

Men's singles

   Martin Kližan def.  Darian King 6–3, 6–3.

Women's singles

  Sara Errani def.  Kateryna Bondarenko 6–4, 6–2

Men's doubles

  Austin Krajicek /  Jackson Withrow def.  Evan King /  Nathan Pasha 6–7(3–7), 6–1, [11–9].

Women's doubles

   Taylor Townsend /  Yanina Wickmayer def.  Jennifer Brady /  Vania King 6–4, 6–4

References

External links 
 Official website

2018
2018 ATP Challenger Tour
2018 WTA 125K series
2018 in American sports